George Deane may refer to:

 George Deane (cricketer) (1828–1929), English cricketer
 George B. Deane, Sr. (1818–1903), American politician from New York
 George Campbell Deane, Chief Justice of the Gold Coast Colony, 1929–35
 George Deane (MP)

See also
 George Dean (1867–1933), ferry boat master in Sydney, Australia, charged with attempting to poison his wife